Mattia Aversa (born 23 July 1986) is an Italian backstroke swimmer who competed in the 2008 Summer Olympics.

References

1986 births
Living people
Italian male backstroke swimmers
Olympic swimmers of Italy
Swimmers at the 2008 Summer Olympics
21st-century Italian people